Juan José Campanella (born 19 July 1959) is an Argentine television and film director, writer and producer. He achieved worldwide attention with the release of The Secret in Their Eyes (2009), for which he was awarded the Academy Award for Best Foreign Language Film.

Early life 
Campanella was born in Buenos Aires, Argentina. He started studying engineering, but dropped out in 1980 after four years at university. He would later remark that the decisive factor for this decision was watching All That Jazz on the very day he was going to apply for a fifth year. His debut as director was in 1979, with the short Prioridad nacional. Campanella traveled to the United States and entered the Tisch School of the Arts. Four years later, in 1984, his second film, Victoria 392, which marked the first of five collaborations with actor friend Eduardo Blanco, as well as his first collaboration with screenwriter Fernando Castets, with whom he co-directed and co-wrote the film.

Career
After graduating from NYU film school, Campanella went on to direct two American films: The Boy Who Cried Bitch in 1991 and Love Walked In in 1997.

In 1999, Campanella reunited once more with Castets to write El Mismo Amor, la Misma Lluvia, which starred actor friend Ricardo Darín (who had met Campanella 15 years before, abroad) and Eduardo Blanco. The formula would be repeated with two other films, in El Hijo de la Novia, 2001 (nominated for Oscar for best foreign language film in 2002) and in Luna de Avellaneda, 2004, all of which teamed Campanella and Castests as screenwriters, and Darín and Blanco as leading and supporting actor, respectively. Darín reprised the role of Campanella's leading man in the mystery film The Secret in Their Eyes (2009), Campanella's fourth feature-length film. It won the Academy Award for Best Foreign Language Film in 2010.

Campanella has directed episodes of American TV series such as House, Law & Order: Special Victims Unit, Law & Order: Criminal Intent, 30 Rock, Halt and Catch Fire and Colony.

Campanella has worked 5 times with Blanco, 4 times with Ricardo Darín and 2 times with Héctor Alterio. Campanella has also directed a number of Argentine actors, including Norma Aleandro, Alfredo Alcón, Ulises Dumont, Natalia Verbeke, Adrián Suar, Mercedes Morán, Valeria Bertuccelli and Rodrigo de la Serna, as well as English-speaking actors Chris Meloni, Denis Leary, Adrien Brody, Moira Kelly, Justin Long, Vincent D'Onofrio, Alec Baldwin, Tina Fey, Tracy Morgan, Rachel Dratch, Hope Davis, Jay Hernandez, Bridget Moynahan, Stephen Colbert, and Hugh Laurie.

Personal life
Campanella holds a Master in Fine Arts from New York University and is studying towards a Masters in Political Science from Universidad Torcuato di Tella. He has held Spanish citizenship since 2006.

Filmography

Film

Producer only

Television

Plays 
 Parque Lezama (2014) 
 ¿Que hacemos con Walter? (2018)

Awards and nominations

Wins
 1995 Daytime Emmy Award for Outstanding Directing in a Children's Special for Lifestories: Families in Crisis: A Child Betrayed: The Calvin Mire Story
 1997 Daytime Emmy Award for Outstanding Directing in a Children's Special for Lifestories: Families in Crisis: Someone Had to be Benny
 1999 Silver Condor Award for Best Film for Same Love, Same Rain
 1999 Silver Condor Award for Best Director for Same Love, Same Rain
 1999 Silver Condor Award for Best Original Screenplay for Same Love, Same Rain
 2001 Silver Condor Award for Best Film for Son of the Bride
 2001 Silver Condor Award for Best Director for Son of the Bride
 2001 Silver Condor Award for Best Original Screenplay for Son of the Bride
 2009 Silver Condor Award for Best Film for The Secret in Their Eyes
 2009 Silver Condor Award for Best Director for The Secret in Their Eyes
 2009 Silver Condor Award for Best Adapted Screenplay for The Secret in Their Eyes
 2009 Ariel Award for Best Best Ibero-American Film for The Secret in Their Eyes
 2009 Goya Award for Best Spanish Language Foreign Film for The Secret in Their Eyes
 2009 Academy Award for Best Foreign Language Film for The Secret in Their Eyes
 2013 Goya Award for Best Animated Film for Futbolín (Metegol)

Nominations
 1993 Daytime Emmy Award for Outstanding Directing in a Children's Special for Lifestories: Families in Crisis: Public Law 106: The Becky Bell Story
 1994 Daytime Emmy Award for Outstanding Directing in a Children's Special for Lifestories: Families in Crisis: Dead Drunk: The Kevin Tunell Story
 1996 Daytime Emmy Award for Outstanding Directing in a Children's Special for CBS Schoolbreak Special: Stand Up
 2001 Academy Award for Best Foreign Language Film for Son of the Bride
 2009 Goya Award for Best Film for The Secret in Their Eyes
 2009 Goya Award for Best Director for The Secret in Their Eyes
 2009 Goya Award for Best Adapted Screenplay for The Secret in Their Eyes
 2010 César Award for Best Foreign Film for The Secret in Their Eyes
 2010 European Film Award for Best Film for The Secret in Their Eyes
 2011 David di Donatello for Best European Film for The Secret in Their Eyes
 2011 BAFTA Award for Best Film Not in the English Language for The Secret in Their Eyes

References

External links 

 

1959 births
Argentine people of Italian descent
Living people
Argentine screenwriters
Male screenwriters
Argentine male writers
Argentine film directors
Directors of Best Foreign Language Film Academy Award winners
Tisch School of the Arts alumni
Writers from Buenos Aires